Hingst is a surname. Notable people with the surname include:

Ariane Hingst (born 1979), German footballer and analyst
Carolin Hingst (born 1980), German pole vaulter
Evert Hingst (1969–2005), Dutch lawyer
Hans Hingst, German SS officer
Sérgio Hingst (1924–2004), Brazilian actor